Wadera  is a town in south-eastern Ethiopia. It is named after the nearby Wadera Forest. Wadera is the administrative center of Wadera woreda.

Wadera is located on the main all-weather road which runs through Wadera and ends at Negele. This town has both telephone and postal service, and is supplied with electricity by the Ethiopian Electric Power Corporation from the national grid.

Demographics 
Based on figures from the Central Statistical Agency in 2005, this town has an estimated total population of 6,999 of whom 3,537 are men and 3,462 are women. The 1994 national census reported this town had a total population of 3,912 of whom 1,994 were men and 1,918 were women.

Notes 

Populated places in the Oromia Region